Ana Lídia Fernandes Oliveira Pereira is a Portuguese politician of the Social Democratic Party (PSD) who has been serving as a Member of the European Parliament since 2019. She is also president of the Youth of the European People's Party (YEPP).

Early life and education
Pereira has a degree in Economics from the University of Coimbra and a MSc in European Economic Studies from the College of Europe.

Political career
In the 2019 European elections Pereira was the first politician to run a carbon neutral political campaign, drawing attention to climate change. As number 2 in the list she stood out as a political renewal of Portuguese MEPs. Since joining the European Parliament, she has been serving as her parliamentary group's deputy coordinator in the Committee on Economic and Monetary Affairs and as member of the Committee on the Environment, Public Health and Food Safety. In 2020, she also joined the Subcommittee on Tax Matters.

In addition to her committee assignments, Pereira is part of the European Parliament Intergroup on Anti-Corruption and the European Parliament Intergroup on Seas, Rivers, Islands and Coastal Areas.

In 2021, Pereira was part of the European Parliament’s official delegation to the  United Nations Climate Change Conference (COP26).

Other activities 
 UNITE – Parliamentary Network to End HIV/AIDS, Viral Hepatitis and Other Infectious Diseases, Member (since 2019)

References

1991 births
Living people
MEPs for Portugal 2019–2024
21st-century women MEPs for Portugal
Social Democratic Party (Portugal) MEPs